Eduard Georgievich Ivanov (April 25, 1938 – January 15, 2012) was a Russian ice hockey player who played in the Soviet Hockey League.  Ivanov was born in Moscow, Soviet Union.  He played for HC CSKA Moscow and appeared in 300 games. In international play, Ivanov appeared in 79 games over his career. He was inducted into the Russian and Soviet Hockey Hall of Fame in 1963. After his playing career Ivanov became a coach with SKA Moskva Oblast and director of CSKA Moskva sports school from 1979 to 1988.

References

External links
 Russian and Soviet Hockey Hall of Fame bio

1938 births
2012 deaths
HC CSKA Moscow players
Ice hockey people from Moscow
Olympic medalists in ice hockey
Olympic gold medalists for the Soviet Union
Olympic ice hockey players of the Soviet Union
Ice hockey players at the 1964 Winter Olympics
Medalists at the 1964 Winter Olympics
Russian ice hockey players
Burials in Troyekurovskoye Cemetery